Ken Hermann, Herman or Herrmann may refer to;

 Ken Hermann, a Danish photographer
 Ken Herman, a Glendora, California, City Council member
 Ken Herrmann, founder of the Association of Pickleball Professionals